Nationality words link to articles with information on the nation's poetry or literature (for instance, Irish or France).

Events
 Jean-Antoine de Baif awarded the Golden Apollo by the Jeux Floraux de Toulouse, in France
 French King Henri of Navarre sends Guillaume Du Bartas on a diplomatic mission to Scotland and England.

Works published

Great Britain
 Thomas Churchyard, The Worthiness of Wales, mostly verse
 Angel Day, Daphnis and Chloe, prose and poetry; a translation from the French of Jacques Amyot
 George Gascoigne, posthumously published (see also  1573,  1575)
 George Turberville, translations from Mambrino Roseo and Boccaccio's Decameron
 George Whetstone, in verse (see "Deaths" section)

Other
 François de Malherbe, Les Larmes de Saint Pierre, presented to Henry III of France, a florid, mannered poem which the author later disowned, France
 Cristóbal de Virués, El Monserrate, Spain
 Jean Papire Masson, a book on the lives of Dante, Petrarch and Boccaccio, published in Paris, France

Births
Death years link to the corresponding "[year] in poetry" article:
 September 18 – Francesca Caccini (died 1641), Italian early Baroque composer, singer, lutenist, poet and music teacher
 October 18 – Lady Mary Wroth (died c. 1651), English poet
 November 17 – Joost van den Vondel (died 1679), Dutch writer considered the most prominent Dutch poet and playwright of the 17th century
 Also:
 Francis Kynaston (died 1642), English courtier, poet and translator
 Yun Seon-do (died 1671), Korean poet and government official

Deaths
Birth years link to the corresponding "[year] in poetry" article:
 February 8 – Mary, Queen of Scots (born 1542), deposed queen regnant and occasional French-language poet, executed
 November – Madeleine Des Roches (born c. 1520) and her daughter, Catherine Des Roches (born 1542), both died of an epidemic on the same day; together they collectively published French prose and poetry; the two hosted a literary circle which included Scévole de Sainte-Marthe, Barnabé Brisson, René Chopin, Antoine Loisel, Claude Binet, Nicolas Rapin and Odet de Turnèbe
 date not known – George Whetstone died about this year (born c. 1544), English playwright, poet and author (see "Works published" section)

See also

 Poetry
 16th century in poetry
 16th century in literature
 Dutch Renaissance and Golden Age literature
 Elizabethan literature
 French Renaissance literature
 Renaissance literature
 Spanish Renaissance literature
 University Wits

Notes

16th-century poetry
Poetry